Monja may refer to:

Monjayaki, a type of dish cooked using an iron plate in Japanese cuisine
Monja (given name)

See also
Monjas, a municipality in Jalapa Department, Guatemala